Hippocrates (died 491 BC) was the second tyrant of Gela and ruled from 498 BC to 491 BC. He was the brother of Cleander and succeeded him to the throne after his death in 498. With him, Gela began its expansion phase; Hippocrates aimed to conquer all of southeastern Sicily in order to build a great state with Gela as its capital. He formed an alliance with Agrigento and conquered Zancle, Camarina, Catana, Naxos and Leontini. He also managed to besiege Syracuse, but had to withdraw, due to Corinthian and Corcyran involvement in the war. During his government, his city became the most powerful and flourishing among the Greek colonies in Sicily. Hippocrates died in battle against the Sicels. He designated his sons, Euclides and Cleander, as his successors, but they were soon replaced by the commander of the cavalry, Gelo who became the new tyrant of Gela.

References 

  

|width=25% align=center|Preceded by:Cleander
|width=25% align=center|Tyrant of Gela498 BC – 491 BC
|width=25% align=center|Succeeded by:Gelo

491 BC deaths
Ancient Geloans
Sicilian tyrants
5th-century BC Greek people
Year of birth unknown